Rodney H. Weston (born March 28, 1964) is a businessman and politician in New Brunswick, Canada. He represented the Saint John electoral district as a Member of Parliament from 2008 until 2015.

Biography
Weston was born in Saint John, New Brunswick, the son of Lester and Phyllis Weston. He was a post-secondary student at New Brunswick Community College.

Weston owned and operated a gas station and also was a trucking contractor as well as chief of the St. Martins Volunteer Fire Department.

Weston entered public life in his service as deputy mayor for St. Martins.

From 1999 until 2003 New Brunswick general election, Weston represented the riding of Saint John-Fundy in the Legislative Assembly of New Brunswick as a Progressive Conservative member, and was Minister of Agriculture, Fisheries & Aquaculture from 2001 to 2003. In 2003 he lost his bid for re-election. He was then named chief of staff for the province's premier, Bernard Lord.

In his first foray into federal politics, in 2008, Weston was elected as Conservative MP for the electoral district of Saint John, defeating incumbent Liberal Paul Zed. He was re-elected in 2011 but in the wake of the Duffy affair did not hold his seat, now renamed Saint John—Rothesay, when at the 2015 Canadian federal election the Liberal Party of Canada won every seat east of Quebec; Weston personally lost to Wayne Long.

Weston ran in Saint John—Rothesay again in the 2019 Canadian federal election but again came second to Long.

Electoral record

Federal

Provincial

References

External links
New Brunswick MLAs, New Brunswick Legislative Library (pdf)

1964 births
Conservative Party of Canada MPs
Living people
Members of the House of Commons of Canada from New Brunswick
Politicians from Saint John, New Brunswick
Progressive Conservative Party of New Brunswick MLAs
21st-century Canadian politicians
Members of the Executive Council of New Brunswick